Aqa Ali Sara (also Romanized as Āqā ‘Alī Sarā) is a village in Otaqvar Rural District, Otaqvar District, Langarud County, Gilan Province, Iran. At the 2006 census, its population was 139, in 37 families.

References 

Populated places in Langarud County